At 8:18am on 27 February 1995, a car bomb exploded in Zakho, a city which is 12 miles from the Turkish border in Dohuk Governorate, Kurdistan Region, Iraq. It happened during the Iraqi Kurdish Civil War, which began nine months earlier. The bomb was made from 330 pounds of dynamite and exploded whilst the car (a taxi) was outside a tea shop which was located in a busy marketplace. 100 people were killed and 150 injured.

See also
 List of terrorist incidents, 1995
 Terrorism in Iraq
 Zakho resort attack

References

1995 in Iraq
1995 murders in Iraq
20th-century mass murder in Iraq
Attacks on buildings and structures in 1995
Attacks on buildings and structures in Iraq
Attacks on restaurants in Asia
Car and truck bombings in Iraq
February 1995 crimes
February 1995 events in Asia
Improvised explosive device bombings in 1995
Improvised explosive device bombings in Iraq
Marketplace attacks in Iraq
Mass murder in 1995
Terrorist incidents in Asia in 1995

1995 bombing
Building bombings in Iraq